Tsaghkahovit, known as Haji Khalil  until 1946, is a village in the Tsaghkahovit Municipality of the Aragatsotn Province of Armenia.

References 

World Gazetteer: Armenia – World-Gazetteer.com

Kiesling, Rediscovering Armenia, p. 23, available online at the US embassy to Armenia's website

Populated places in Aragatsotn Province